Pleasant Ridge may refer to a place in the United States:

 Pleasant Ridge (Wilcox County, Alabama), a plantation near Camden, Alabama
 Pleasant Ridge, Indiana (disambiguation), several places
 Pleasant Ridge Plantation, Maine
 Pleasant Ridge, Michigan
 Pleasant Ridge, Barry County, Missouri
 Pleasant Ridge, Harrison County, Missouri
 Pleasant Ridge, Texas County, Missouri
 Pleasant Ridge, Cincinnati, Ohio
 Pleasant Ridge, Wisconsin
 Pleasant Ridge, Grant County, Wisconsin